James Cerretani and Philipp Oswald were the defending champions, but Cerretani chose to compete in Sofia instead. Oswald played alongside Treat Huey, but lost in the first round to Alessandro Motti and Stefano Travaglia.

Nicolás Jarry and Hans Podlipnik-Castillo won the title, defeating Austin Krajicek and Jackson Withrow in the final, 7–6(8–6), 6–3.

Seeds

Draw

Draw

References
 Main Draw

Ecuador Open Quito - Doubles
2018 Doubles